Simon Sheppard (born 7 August 1973 in Clevedon) is an English former football goalkeeper. During his career he played in the Football League for Watford, Scarborough, Reading, and Chelsea before dropping into non-league football with Boreham Wood and Kettering Town. Sheppard played for England at schoolboy level, and also represented his country at the 1993 FIFA World Youth Championship. He was one of three Watford youth goalkeepers from the 1980s to play for his country; the other two were David James and Derick Williams.

References

External links

1973 births
Living people
English footballers
Watford F.C. players
Scarborough F.C. players
Reading F.C. players
Boreham Wood F.C. players
Kettering Town F.C. players
People from Clevedon
England youth international footballers
Association football goalkeepers